The 2020 Professional Women's Bowling Association (PWBA) Tour retained a similar schedule to the 2019 season, with nine standard singles tournaments and four majors, plus the PBA-PWBA mixed doubles tournament. The 2020 PWBA season was expected to start on April 23, but as of March 15 it was postponed indefinitely due to the coronavirus pandemic.

On June 3, 2020, the PWBA chose to cancel the 2020 season due to continued uncertainty surrounding the COVID-19 pandemic. According to USBC Executive Director Chad Murphy: “Sadly, we do not see a workable way to operate a national tour in 2020 across varying venues and states in a manner that meets standards for a professional sports league.”  BPAA Executive Director Frank DeSocio noted there is still a possibility to conduct special, non-title events for PWBA players later in 2020.

Tournament summary

Below is a list of events that were scheduled for the 2020 PWBA Tour season prior to the COVID-19 shutdown.  Major tournaments are in bold.

References

External links
 PWBA.com, home of the Professional Women' Bowling Association

2020 in bowling